Paul Zsolnay Verlag is an Austrian publishing company.

Overview
The company was created in 1923 by Paul Zsolnay. It was the most successful publishing company during the interwar period, publishing authors such as John Galsworthy, H. G. Wells, Pearl S. Buck, A. J. Cronin, Franz Werfel, Felix Salten, Robert Neumann, Roda Roda, Hilde Spiel, Ernst Lothar, Hans Kaltneker, Friedrich Torberg, Leo Perutz, Heinrich Mann, Kasimir Edschmid, Carl Sternheim, Emil Ludwig, Walter von Molo, and Frank Thiess.

Nazi era 
After Austria's Anschluss with Nazi Germany in 1938, the publishing house's owner, Paul Zsolnay, was subject to Nazi anti-Jewish restrictions. After initial attempts to "trick" the Nazis by utilizing an “Aryan” titular head to his firm, he fled to London. The Gestapo closed the publishing house in April 1939, until the non-Jewish bookseller Karl H. Bischoff took over.

In London, Zsolnay worked for the British publisher Heinemann,  helping to set up the imprint Heinemann & Zsolnay.  Paul Zsolnay lived in England from 1938 to 1946.

Postwar 
When Zsolnay returned to Vienna in 1946, he recovered the business and renamed it the Heinemann & Zsolnay Verlag,

References

External links 
 

Publishing companies established in 1923
Book publishing companies of Austria
Jews and Judaism in Austria
Jews and Judaism in Vienna
1923 establishments in Austria